Svitlana Ivanivna Maziy (born 30 January 1968 in Kiev) is a retired rower from Ukraine, who twice won an Olympic medal during her career. She is a four-time Olympian.

After having won the silver medal for the Soviet Union in the Women's Quadruple Sculls at the 1988 Summer Olympics Frolova repeated that feat, rowing for independent Ukraine at the 1996 Summer Olympics. In Atlanta, Georgia her team mates were Olena Ronzhyna, Inna Frolova, and Dina Miftakhutdynova.

References
 sports-reference

1968 births
Living people
Soviet female rowers
Ukrainian female rowers
Olympic rowers of Ukraine
Olympic rowers of the Soviet Union
Rowers at the 1988 Summer Olympics
Rowers at the 1996 Summer Olympics
Rowers at the 2000 Summer Olympics
Rowers at the 2004 Summer Olympics
Olympic silver medalists for the Soviet Union
Olympic silver medalists for Ukraine
Sportspeople from Kyiv
Olympic medalists in rowing
Medalists at the 1996 Summer Olympics
Medalists at the 1988 Summer Olympics
World Rowing Championships medalists for the Soviet Union